Charles Pearce may refer to:

 Charlie Pearce, New Zealand rugby league international
 Charles Pearce (calligrapher) (born 1943), calligrapher
 Charles E. M. Pearce (1940–2012), New Zealand mathematician
 Charles Edward Pearce (1842–1902), United States Congressman from Missouri
 Charles H. Pearce, African Methodist Episcopal clergyman in Florida
 Charles Sprague Pearce (1851–1914), American painter
 Charles Thomas Pearce (1815–1883), English physician and opponent to mandatory vaccination

See also

Charles Ormerod Cato Pearse (1884–1953), South African cricketer
Charles Sanders Peirce (1839–1914), American logician, mathematician, scientist, philosopher
Charles Pierce (disambiguation)